The BLS RABe 525, also known as NINA or Nina, is a Swiss electric multiple unit built by Bombardier Transportation with electrical equipment by Alstom. The train is principally used by the BLS AG on Bern S-Bahn services, although small quantities have been built for other railways. An updated version exists as the BLS RABe 535, also known as Lötschberger, also exists with a revised front end and an interior intended for longer distance services.

The articulated trainset was designed to be built with from two to six sections and with two to six motorized axles. Only three and four section units have been built.

Bibliography 
Josef Stöckli, Hans Vorburger: Die Niederflur-Nahverkehrs-Pendelzüge RABe 525 „NINA“ der BLS, TMR und TRN. In: Eisenbahn-Revue International, Heft 2/2003, S. 68–79.

External links
 
 Vehicle description of RABe 525 from the BLS web site (in German)

Multiple units of Switzerland

Stadler Rail multiple units
Bombardier Transportation multiple units